The commune of Busiga is a commune of Ngozi Province in northern Burundi. The capital lies at Busiga.

See also 
Commune of Marangara

References

Communes of Burundi
Ngozi Province